Sébastien Lacroix (born 20 April 1983) is a French Nordic combined skier who has competed between 2001 and 2015. At the 2010 Winter Olympics in Vancouver, he finished fourth in the 4 x 5 km team event and finished 19th in both the 10 km individual normal hill and the 10 km individual large hill events.

Lacroix finished fourth in the 4 x 5 km team event and 27th in the 10 km individual large hill event at the FIS Nordic World Ski Championships 2009 in Liberec.

In the FIS Nordic World Ski Championships in Val di Fiemme 2013 he won gold medals in both team events; normal and large hill.

His best World Cup finish was fifth in a 4 x 5 km team event at Germany in 2009 while his best individual finish was seventh in a 10 km individual large hill event at Italy that same year. His best career finish is second on seven occasions in lesser events since 2003.

References

1983 births
French male Nordic combined skiers
Living people
Nordic combined skiers at the 2010 Winter Olympics
Nordic combined skiers at the 2014 Winter Olympics
Olympic Nordic combined skiers of France
Université Savoie-Mont Blanc alumni
FIS Nordic World Ski Championships medalists in Nordic combined